Aleksandar "Aco" Pejović (born 18 April 1972) is a Serbian popular pop-folk singer.

Education and career
He completed musical education at the Vasa Pavić High School for Music (Srednja muzička škola Vasa Pavić) in Podgorica. He has lived in Belgrade since 1994 when he came to prominence with his group "Trag".

Discography
Viđaš li je, druže moj (2000)
Prevara (2002)
Opušteno (2004)
Neverna (2006)
U mojim venama (2007)
Aco Pejović (2010)
Sve ti dugujem (2013)
Parče neba (2015)

External links 

1972 births
Living people
People from Prijepolje
Serbian folk-pop singers
Grand Production artists
21st-century Serbian male singers